Padmavati  also known as Alamelu Manga is a Hindu goddess and the consort of the deity Venkateswara, a form of Vishnu. She is described as a daughter of a local king and an avatar of goddess Lakshmi, the consort of Vishnu.  

The most prominent shrine of Padmavati is Padmavati Ammavari Temple situated at Tiruchanur, a suburb of Tirupati. Tradition dictates that every pilgrim to Tirupati must offer obeisance at this temple before visiting the Tirumala Venkateswara Temple, the central temple of her consort.

Legend

Narada once observed a few rishis performing a holy yagna. Unable to decide who the yagna should benefit, he recruited the sage Bhrigu for the task, who travelled the three worlds in search of the deity who was most worthy of it. Upon visiting Satyalokam, Brahma was found busy chanting the Vedas with one face, uttering the name of Narayana with the other, and looking at the goddess Saraswati with the third. He took no notice of Bhrigu’s arrival. Bhrigu then proceeded to Kailasam, and here too, he found Shiva absorbed in playing with his consort Parvati taking no notice of his visit. He finally reached Vaikuntha and met Vishnu. Vishnu was smiling and meditating in a reclined posture and his consort Lakshmi was serving him out of her love. A furious Bhrigu kicked Vishnu's chest (the abode of Lakshmi) and infuriated Lakshmi. But a calm Vishnu asked for forgiveness to Bhrigu, and served the sage by massaging his legs, and destroyed the eye in Bhrigu's leg, the root of the sage's ego.

This disappointed Lakshmi. So, she left Vaikuntha, and departed for earth. Meanwhile, Vishnu arrived at Tirumala Hills as Venkateshvara, and meditated upon Lakshmi. Lakshmi had incarnated as Padmavati, the daughter of Akasha Raja. Princess Padmavati had grown into a beautiful maiden, and was visited by Narada. On reading her palm, he foretold that she was destined to be the spouse of Vishnu himself. Srinivasa, the next incarnation of Vishnu, was on a hunting spree, chasing a wild elephant in the forest. The elephant led him into a garden where Princess Padmavati and her maids were playing. The sight of the elephant frightened them and their princess. When Srinivasa appeared in front of the elephant, it immediately turned round, saluted him, and disappeared into the forest. He noticed the princess Padmavati, and enquired about her from her maids. Enthralled by her bewitching beauty, he won her hand in marriage, and requested a loan from the god Kubera for the wedding ceremony, promising to repay it by the end of the Kali Yuga. Srinivasa then married Padmavati in great pomp and splendour.

Hymns
Padmavati is a major deity in Hinduism worshipped as an aspect of the goddess Lakshmi and her second aspect, Bhumi. It is believed that her intercession is indispensable to gaining the favour of the lord, it is also believed that Lakshmi is omnipresent, illimitable, and the bestower of moksham along with Vishnu in Sri Vaishnavism. Nammalvar, in his Tiruvaymoli, praises Padmavati thus:

The Venkateswara Suprabhatam also suitably offers veneration to Padmavati:

See also
Padmavathi Temple, Tiruchanur
Tiruchanur
Sri Padmavati Mahila Visvavidyalayam, a university named after Padmavati

References

External links 
The Tirumala-Tirupati Devasthanam website
Sri Venkatdhvari Kavi's Sri Lakshmi Saharam Praising Alarmelmanga Thayar 

Lakshmi
Tirumala Venkateswara Temple
Hindu goddesses